, better known by his mononymous stage name Gackt (stylized as GACKT), is a Japanese musician, singer, songwriter, record producer and actor.

Born in Okinawa, Japan, to a Ryukyuan family, Gackt learned the piano at a young age and was raised on classical music and enka before becoming interested in rock music while attending high school. He has been active since 1993, first as the frontman of the short-lived independent band Cains:Feel, and then for the now-defunct visual kei rock band Malice Mizer, before starting his solo career in 1999. He has released nine studio albums and, with forty-eight singles released, holds the male soloist record for most top ten consecutive singles in Japanese music history. His single "Returner (Yami no Shūen)", released on June 20, 2007, was his first and only single to reach the number one spot on the Oricon charts. As a solo artist, Gackt has sold over 10 million records.

Besides being established in the modern entertainment industry, Gackt's music has been used as theme songs for video games (Dirge of Cerberus: Final Fantasy VII), anime films (New Fist of the North Star and Mobile Suit Zeta Gundam) and television series (Kamen Rider Decade). In addition to his music career, Gackt has acted in a few films (Fly Me to the Saitama), including a film he wrote, Moon Child, his international debut Bunraku, and TV series such as the NHK drama Fūrin Kazan. He also performed live in theatre stage plays, one duology of which was written, composed, and directed by him: Moon Saga: Mysteries of Yoshitsune I & II. He has performed classical arrangements of his songs twice with the Tokyo Philharmonic Orchestra. He also provided the voice samples for Internet Co., Ltd.'s first Vocaloid, Gackpoid.

Early life
Gackt was born on July 4, 1973, as the second of three children in a Ryukyuan family, in Okinawa, Japan. His father was a music teacher, who primarily played the trumpet, and his mother was also a teacher. Gackt has an older sister and a younger brother. Because of his father's job, he lived in many different cities in addition to Okinawa: Yamaguchi, Fukuoka, Shiga, Osaka, and Kyoto. He studied in the Moriyama high school in Shiga, and was enrolled in the Kyoto Gakuen University.

Gackt's musical education began at age three when his parents initiated his classical piano education. At age seven, continuing his classical piano education became more difficult because of time spent at elementary school and the repeated change of instructors due to relocating from city to city. It would take another four years until his parents allowed him to quit lessons. However, after losing a piano competition to a boy he met in the middle school, Gackt voluntarily returned to his piano studies, even writing orchestral scores. He has credited the classical pianist and composer Frédéric Chopin with being "the one who taught me the beauty, depth, fun, sadness, the kindness of music; that music could grant people courage, and the meaning of the layers of sound. It isn't an exaggeration to say Chopin is the foundation of my music". Since his father played the trumpet, Gackt is also familiar with brass instruments. Having only listened to classical music and enka while growing up, he did not become interested in rock music until high school, and went on to master modern percussion. He was initially reluctant to join amateur rock bands because he considered their playing quality below average, compared to his experience while playing in an orchestra. However, the excitement and response from audiences convinced him to continue performing in those amateur bands.

Music career

1993–1998: First musical efforts and Malice Mizer

In the early 1990s, Gackt was working as a host and dealer in a casino, while also being an assistant drummer for an amateur band. At the time he wanted to become more serious about his music activity but had a negative perspective on life. While at the casino, he met a businessman who inspired him to find a purpose in life, that being music. About a year later he left the band and he found himself working multiple jobs, among them as a sound technician at a studio where he could practice drums. When Gackt was twenty-years old, he met guitarist You Kurosaki, his future solo career support guitarist, at a music live house in Kyoto. They formed the band, Cains:Feel, whose name had biblical reference to the story of Cain and Abel. The group lacked a vocalist, so Gackt became the frontman, and the band went to record a demo tape before disbanding.

In 1995, he was introduced to the visual kei band Malice Mizer which was on hiatus due to the departure of their frontman Tetsu. Gackt moved to Tokyo and joined them in October 1995. As their vocalist, pianist and primary lyricist, he also contributed two songs in their catalog, "Regret" and "Le Ciel", the latter being their most successful single as a band. During this time, the band's fame soared; and, after four years and two studio albums, in January 1999, it was officially announced that he left the band. According to his autobiography, the members' differences, the sudden income of money, and his isolation from the band led to his departure. Mana said he contacted Gackt in regards to him participating in the band's 25th anniversary concerts in September 2018, but the singer declined.

1999–2001: Solo debut, Mizérable, Mars, and Rebirth
Gackt launched his solo career on January 1, 1999. After completing his recordings, his first gig as a solo artist was the 99 Gackt Resurrection tour held in 11 locations across Japan. It was followed on May 12 with his debut release, the extended play Mizérable, released by Nippon Crown. The album peaked at number two, spending 12 weeks on the Oricon charts. It spanned the same-titled single "Mizérable", which peaked at number three, spending nine weeks on the charts. The album showcases Gackt's "talent for orchestration, blending classical elements into the rock genre", indicating his future style which "ranges from romantically classical to experimental and unfolding progressive rock". In July, he performed at Shock Wave Illusion in Osaka and Tokyo. On August 11, Gackt released his second single, "Vanilla". It peaked at number four, spent 10 weeks on the charts, and enjoyed considerable success. It was certified gold by the Recording Industry Association of Japan (RIAJ).

In 2000, on February 9 and 16, the third and fourth singles were released, "Mirror" and "Oasis". They peaked at number nine and number seven, respectively, and both spent six weeks on the charts. His fifth single was released on March 8, "Seki-Ray", which peaked at number seven, charting for six weeks. At the beginning of the year, Gackt was joined by support guitarist and associate producer Chachamaru. For Caparison Guitars, Gackt designed two guitars, named "Marcury" and "Venus", which he occasionally uses in his live performances. On April 26, his first full-length studio album, Mars, was released. It peaked at number three, spent five weeks on the charts, and was certified gold by RIAJ. The following day Gackt went on a nationwide tour Mars Sora Kara no Homonsha -Kaisō-, which included 16 concerts, and on July 1, he performed the final concert at Yokohama Arena. On August 30, the sixth single, "Saikai (Story)", was released. It peaked at number seven, spending six weeks on the charts. The seventh single, "Secret Garden", was released on November 16; it reached number ten, and charted for five weeks. On December 16, 2000, Gackt released the first in the series of Platinum Boxes.

In 2001, on March 14, Gackt released his eighth single, "Kimi no Tame ni Dekiru Koto", which peaked at number six, and charted for 18 weeks, Gackt's longest-charted single until 2009. On April 25, the second studio album, Rebirth was released. It was Gackt's first concept album, conceived around a fictional narrative during the time of World War II, named "Requiem et Reminiscence". The album includes previously released singles "Seki-Ray" and "Secret Garden". It peaked at number three, spent 21 weeks on the charts. On May 3, Gackt went on the Requiem et Reminiscence tour, which included 18 concerts at fourteen venues. The final concert was held on June 23 at the Yokohama Arena. His ninth single, "Another World" was released on September 5. It was Gackt's first single to reach number two spot on the charts, spent 17 weeks on them, and managed to sell over two hundred and fifty thousand copies. After the events of September 11th, 2001, in New York, Gackt wrote a song for a world peace. It was released December 2001 as a single, "Jūnigatsu no Love Song". It peaked at number five and charted for nine weeks. From 2001 to 2004, the single was recorded in Japanese, English, Korean, and Chinese, which were all released before Christmas. On New Year's Eve, Gackt performed "Another World" for the first time at the annual music show, the 52nd Kōhaku Uta Gassen.

2002–2003: Moon, the film Moon Child, and Crescent

In the second half of 2001, during the release of "Another World", Gackt started his second concept, project "Moon Saga". In 2002, on April 24, he released his eleventh single "Wasurenai Kara". It peaked at number four, spending five weeks on the charts. On June 6, Gackt went on the nationwide live house tour which represented his new concept and included nine concerts at eight venues. The final concert was held on July 10, at Zepp Sendai. On June 16, the third studio concept album Moon was released. It is Gackt's best-selling album, reached number two on the charts, and was certified gold by RIAJ. On September 22, 2002, at the Beijing Worker's Gymnasium, in China, a large musical event "China-Japan: Holding Hands, Moving Together" was held as part of "Japan-China Diplomatic Relations Normalization 30th Anniversary Commemoration", and Gackt was among the handful who represented his homeland. On October 14, he continued the concept with the nationwide tour , which included 22 concerts among fifteen venues. The final concert was held on December 24, at the Yokohama Arena. On New Year's Eve, Gackt performed "Jūnigatsu no Love Song" at the 53rd Kōhaku Uta Gassen.

In 2003, Gackt worked on his film, Moon Child. He co-wrote the script and did his own action scenes on location in Taiwan. In collaboration with co-star Hyde, he also sang the film's theme song . The film was released on April 19 in Japan and screened on May 13 at the Cannes Film Festival and on April 12, 2004, at Philadelphia Film Festival. On March 19, his thirteenth single, "Kimi ga Oikaketa Yume", was released, which is the second of five to reach number two on the charts, spending 10 weeks on them. It was certified gold by RIAJ. On May 4 the nationwide tour  was launched, continuing the concept of the previous one, and included 13 concerts at eight venues. On June 11, the fourteenth single, "Tsuki no Uta", was released. It peaked at number three, and it was certified gold by RIAJ. On July 6, the final concert of the tour was held at the Yokohama Arena. On September 26, Gackt released his autobiography . On September 27, he performed as a special guest at the TV Asahi 45th anniversary commemorative "Kingdom Rock Show". On October 2, Gackt performed the John Lennon song "Love", at the "Dream Power: John Lennon Super Live" concert organized by Yoko Ono in Saitama Super Arena. Besides the film and musical recordings for the project, in October he published a novel . On November 12, the sixteenth single, "Last Song", was released and peaked at number five. It spent 13 weeks on the charts and was certified gold by RIAJ. On December 3, the fourth studio concept album, Crescent, was released. It also peaked at number five, through 11 weeks on the charts, and was certified platinum by RIAJ. On New Year's Eve, Gackt performed "Last Song" at the 54th Kōhaku Uta Gassen.

2004–2005: The Sixth Day and The Seventh Night, Love Letter, Diabolos
In February 2004, his first compilation album, The Sixth Day: Single Collection was released. It peaked at number three, spent 23 weeks on the charts, and was certified platinum by RIAJ. On April 29, Gackt went on the nationwide tour The Sixth Day & Seventh Night, which included 15 concerts in eight venues. In May, Gackt released another compilation album, The Seventh Night: Unplugged, containing the acoustic arrangements of previously released songs. It peaked at number five, spent eight weeks on the charts, and was certified gold by RIAJ. On July 4 was held the final concert of the tour at the Yokohama Arena. In October, the eighteenth single, "Kimi ni Aitakute", was released. It peaked at number two, spent 17 weeks on the charts, and was certified gold by RIAJ. In December, he appeared and performed at the M.net/Km Music Video Festival, where he received the award for "Best Asian Rock Artist". On New Year's Eve, Gackt performed "Kimi ni Aitakute" at the 55th Kōhaku Uta Gassen.

In January 2005, Gackt released the single "Arittake no Ai de", which peaked at number seven, and his fifth studio album, Love Letter, on Valentine's Day. It peaked at number five, spent 13 weeks on the charts, was certified gold by RIAJ, and was re-recorded in Korean and released in June for the Korean market. "Black Stone" was released in April. The single peaked at number three and was certified gold by RIAJ. In May, his twenty-second single, "Metamorphoze", was used in the movie Mobile Suit Zeta Gundam. It was his fourth single to reach number two, spent 13 weeks on the charts, and was certified gold by RIAJ. In August, Gackt released his twenty-third single, "Todokanai Ai to Shitteita no ni Osaekirezu ni Aishitsuzuketa...". It peaked at number three and was certified gold by RIAJ. In September, his sixth studio album, Diabolos, was released. Conceptually, it was a prequel to the previous "Moon" albums. It reached number four on the charts and was certified gold by RIAJ. Gackt launched his nationwide tour, Diabolos ~Aien no Shi~, including 36 concerts across Japan, which ended with a final Christmas Eve spectacle at the Tokyo Dome, in front of more than forty-two thousand people.

2006–2007: First solo tours in Asia, Fūrin Kazan and S.K.I.N.
In 2006, he continued his tour with a concert on January 14, in Korea, at Fencing Stadium in Korean Olympic Park, which was his first Asian solo concert. In the same month his twenty-fourth single, "Redemption" was released, which included theme songs of the Square Enix game, Dirge of Cerberus: Final Fantasy VII. On February 28, he appeared at the graduation of the Maiko High School in Hyōgo Prefecture. Besides the words of encouragement, he performed an unreleased song especially written for the graduation. It was released the following year on February 7, as "No ni Saku Hana no Yō ni". Since then he appeared in several graduation ceremonies.

In August, at an Otakon conference, it was publicly announced that he would form a supergroup, S.K.I.N., with famous Japanese rock band X Japan co-founder Yoshiki, Luna Sea and X Japan guitarist Sugizo, and guitarist Miyavi. The group made their debut performance on June 29, 2007, at Anime Expo in Long Beach, California,  but no further activities were announced. On December 24, Gackt went on a small nationwide fan club tour D.r.u.g. Party, which also continued with four concerts in Korea and Taiwan.

In January 2007, he played the warlord Uesugi Kenshin in the NHK Taiga drama Fūrin Kazan. On June 20, Gackt released his twenty-seventh single, "Returner (Yami no Shūen)", which was the first in his career (both solo and as a member of a band) to reach the number one spot on the Oricon charts. On August 23, Gackt was invited to perform his Fūrin Kazan television role at Jōetsu city's traditional, 82nd Kenshin Festival, with approximately 203,000 visitors. In October, he held a press conference at the Apple Store in Ginza, Tokyo, where besides advertising the first iPhone, Gackt announced he would have his entire back catalog, with new, previously toured, live song recordings, put up on the iTunes Store, as well as that "The Greatest Filmography" would be released on October 9 in the United States and Canada. His album Diabolos was released on October 26 in eighteen European countries. On November 17 and 27, he performed at M.net/Km Music Video Festival in Korea as a special guest star, and he appeared and performed at the 2007 Japan-China Cultural Exchange Grand Concert Final in Beijing. In Beijing he sang "Jūnigatsu no Love Song" in Japanese, Korean, and Mandarin. On December 10, he appeared at the China Fashion Awards in Beijing, where was given the award "Japanese Artist of the Year". On December 19, Gackt released a compilation album, 0079–0088, including songs used in the Gundam franchise. Gackt also performed at the 58th Kōhaku Uta Gassen.

The year 2007 also saw the creation of the Save our Dears charity to help the victims of the powerful Chūetsu offshore earthquake that struck the Niigata Prefecture. To raise funds for this charity, Gackt designed a keychain and bracelets, in addition, the charity also featured two Orico UPty MasterCard credit cards. Gackt's fan club Dears, raised 2,000,000 (26,041) which Gackt donated to the city of Jōetsu at the 83rd Kenshin Festival in 2008.

2008–2009: Requiem et Reminiscence II tour and Re:Born

On July 31, 2008, Internet Co., Ltd. released Gackpoid, a Vocaloid using a recorded selection of Gackt's voice. On December 3, his twenty-eighth single "Jesus" was released. It peaked at number seven, spending 10 weeks on the charts. On December 14, Gackt went on his longest nationwide tour, Requiem et Reminiscence II -Saisei to Kaikō- (Requiem et Reminiscence II -再生と邂逅-, -Rebirth and Reunion-), which included over 60 concerts in more than 45 cities, reaching an audience of over 210,000 spectators.

On January 28, 2009, his twenty-ninth single "Ghost" was released, and peaked at number six on the charts. On May 18, Gackt was scheduled to perform a concert in South Korea at Seoul's Olympic Hall, but due to the effects of the global recession, the sponsors of the concert withdrew their support. In commemoration of his 10th anniversary as a solo artist, Gackt released four singles: "Koakuma Heaven", "Faraway", "Lost Angels", and "Flower", one week after another, starting from June 17 and ending on July 1. They all managed to enter the top ten on the charts. On June 13, Gackt began the arena part of the tour, and on July 4 held a fanclub concert to celebrate his birthday at the Yoyogi National Stadium. On July 11 and 12, he held the final concerts at the Saitama Super Arena.

As both Gackt and the Kamen Rider Series' Heisei period run had its 10th anniversary, he became involved in the 2009 edition of the franchise, Kamen Rider Decade, to perform its theme songs. These are the first singles that were not written by him, and were released by Avex Trax and Avex Entertainment. In March, his thirtieth single and the series' opening theme, "Journey Through the Decade", was released, peaking at number two and spending 25 weeks on the charts, and certified gold by RIAJ. In August, he released the second theme single for the Kamen Rider Decade film All Riders vs. Dai-Shocker, "The Next Decade". It peaked at number four and spent nine weeks on the charts. He also appeared in the film as Decades iteration of the character Jōji Yūki. The collaboration finished in January 2010 with the release of the final single, "Stay the Ride Alive", which charted the same as his previous one.

In September, he performed as a representative of Japan at the Asia Song Festival in Korea. He also participated in the 2009 Animelo Summer Live concert. In October, Gackt performed as the main artist in the Wow Live! Thanks For Music show held in Yoyogi National Gymnasium, in Japan. On December 2, he released his seventh studio album, Re:Born, which continued the story he had originally created in 2001. It reached number nine on the charts. On December 12, he held a fanclub cover concert conceptualized around fictional school, "Camui Gakuen", at the Saitama Super Arena.

2010–2011: The Eleventh Day, and move to Avex Group
In 2010, on February 14, Gackt participated as a representative of Japan at the Asia Pops Festival held in Niigata, in homage for the victims of 2007 Chūetsu earthquake. On March 6 and 7, he performed the theme songs at the festival organized by Koei to promote their new Wii game, Samurai Warriors 3, at the Saitama Super Arena. On April 17, he officially announced that he transferred from Nippon Crown to Avex Group's recording conglomerate. Prior to the transferring to Avex, he organized a band project Yellow Fried Chickenz, whose name refers to human cowardice, that included Chachamaru and Shinya Yamada. Besides the nationwide tour in June and August, from July 16, he made his first appearance touring Europe, performing at clubs in London, Paris, Barcelona, Munich, and Bochum. On July 21, the compilation album, The Eleventh Day: Single Collection, was released, which was a collection of the singer's singles from the second half of his tenure with Nippon Crown. On August 23, he participated in the 85th Kenshin Festival for the third time, with a record attendance of more than 240,000 visitors. On December 14, he participated in and performed in a Hohoemi project charity event called "Message! to Asia", by DATV at Tokyo Dome, whose profits were planned to help street children in Cambodia and the Philippines.

In 2011, because of the Tōhoku earthquake and tsunami, Gackt founded the "Show Your Heart" charity for collecting money to buy supplies for the victims. All money collected through bank transfers and street fundraising activities was transferred from Rakuten to the Japanese Red Cross, totalling . In July and August, Gackt toured Europe for the second time with Yellow Fried Chickenz, and later toured across Japan. In Europe, he visited 9 countries and performed 14 shows. The Japanese part of tour revenue was also donated to the Japanese Red Cross. A year later on July 4, 2012, at a concert at the Nippon Budokan, Yellow Fried Chickenz was disbanded. On August 22, he participated at the 86th Kenshin Festival.

2012–2014: Best of the Best tour, and move to independent G&Lovers
On March 18 and 19, 2012, Gackt appeared at the Gala party for FilmAid Asia, and the 6th Asian Film Awards, where he also performed, as part of Hong Kong International Film Festival in Hong Kong. On March 29, Gackt performed the national anthem Kimigayo at the Major League Baseball season opening game in Tokyo Dome. It was his fourth time performing the national anthem. On December 15, he performed at the 45th anniversary concert of All Night Nippon, at the Yoyogi National Stadium. In the same month, on December 19, his 43rd single, "White Lovers (Shiawase na Toki)", was released.

In 2013 his first national tour in four years was announced, titled Best of the Best Vol. I, which started on May 11, and ended with three consecutive shows on July 7 at the Yokohama Arena. In July, it was accompanied with the release of two compilation albums, Mild and Wild, including two new songs "Claymore" and "Sakura Chiru...". On August 22, he participated in the 88th Kenshin Festival. On December 22, the final concert of the fourth festival of cover concerts was held, which conceptualized around a fictional school, "Camui Gakuen". On December 26, a special live concert was held where Gackt performed along with the Tokyo Philharmonic Orchestra.

In 2014, since February 12, with the release of his forty-fourth single "P.S. I Love U", his records were released by his independent record label G&Lovers (G-PRO), distributed by Crown Tokuma. In August, Gackt participated at the 89th Kenshin Festival. On October 1, Gackt released his forty-fifth single, "Akatsukizukuyo (Day Breakers)". On December 26, the second live concert with the Tokyo Philharmonic Orchestra was held.

2015–2017: Last Moon and Last Visualive tour
In celebration of Gackt's 15th anniversary on July 1, 2015, the remix album titled, Gacktracks -Ultra DJ ReMix-, was released. It contained club remix versions of his songs done by Japanese DJs, including DJ Koo, Taku Takahashi, Tomoyuki Tanaka (FPM), Jazztronik, Marc Panther and many others. Gackt stated he personally would not decide to do the project from a musical perspective because he was not fond of EDM. He chose the DJs on a first-come, first-served basis, and, because of the great interest for participation, he believed in a second collaboration in the near future. He also expressed his concern on the decline of originality and growing irrelevance of music in modern daily life. On July 3 a release party was also held. On August 23, Gackt participated at the 90th Kenshin Festival for the seventh time overall, with a record high number of 243,000 visitors. On October 7, 2015 his forty-sixth single, "Arrow" was released. On October 23, he embarked on another small tour of cover concerts conceptualized around a fictional school, "Camui Gakuen".

His solo live tour in almost seven years, Last Visualive Saigo no Tsuki –Last Moon–, started with a fanclub only concert on March 19, 2016 at Misato City Cultural Hall in Saitama, with the first public show being held on March 21 at the Colany Hall in Yamanashi. The tour ended on July 3 with two consecutive shows at the Saitama Super Arena. Overall, a total of 42 concerts in thirty cities were held, with an audience of about 120,000 people. The eighth studio album Last Moon was released on April 27, 2016. The 48th single  was released on March 22, 2017.

2018–present: 20th anniversary, temporary hiatus, and return
On July 4, 2018, the "Last Songs" concert was held in celebration of his 45th birthday at Shinkiba Studio Coast, Tokyo, which was broadcast live via NicoNico Live. Between October 11 and 25, eight live performances of the "Camui Gakuen" event were held. On December 31, Gackt sang the national anthem of Japan for the Japanese kickboxer Tenshin Nasukawa before his bout with American boxer Floyd Mayweather Jr. at the Saitama Super Arena. He also joined the live broadcast of Fuji TV as a special guest commentator for the main and semi-final matches. On March 22, 2019, Gackt participated as a representative of Japan at the Hong Kong Asian-Pop Music Festival. On July 4, 2019, a concert was held in celebration of his 46th birthday and 20th anniversary of solo career at Pacifico Yokohama. The 20th anniversary national tour Khaos started at Grand Cube Osaka on January 11 and ended at Fukuoka Sunpalace on February 29, 2020, with 20 performances in eight cities in total. In addition to making a private donation, Gackt sold merchandise during the tour which raised ¥4.7 million to support the reconstruction of the recently burned-down Shuri Castle in Shuri, Okinawa.

It was announced on September 8, 2021 that Gackt would go on an indefinite hiatus for a medical treatment of prolonged neurological disorder which caused severe dysphonia, a neurological vocal condition that prevents him from singing and other activities. In his promise of recovery vowed to make a new album and tour in the future. On May 17, 2022, was announced that was not fully recovered but will resume activites by the end of the year, and in January 2023 stated to feel at "80%". On January 28, 2023, Gackt sang the national anthem at the sumo retirement ceremony in honor of Hakuhō Shō. Gackt was one of the judges of Japan's first season of Got Talent show which premiered on February 11. In March will start a live tour "Last Songs 2023" with South Korean singer-pianist K with whom collaborated two years ago, performing ballads and other songs in arrangements with strings and piano.

Musical style and themes
Gackt's voice has a vibrato pitch at D3-D4, and is capable of using falsetto like for e.g. in song "Ares". According to Gackt, he had expanded the vocal range too much between 2003 and 2004, and searched for a right expression until 2005, since when he has been getting more straightforward. In AllMusic reviews his voice was described as "very melodramatic", as well as "smooth, sleek, unnaturally heartfelt". His songs range from melodic ballads to intense hard rock songs, in which he masterfully combines "raw rock elements" with "listener-friendly compositions". Many songs, like for e.g. "Returner (Yami no Shūen)", are distinctive for their blend of modern Western musical instruments and traditional Japanese instruments, like Shakuhachi, Shamisen, Shinobue, Erhu, Shō, Koto and Taiko, a kind of music called by Gackt as "Zipangu rock" from which can be sensed it originates from Japan.

Most of his studio albums are conceived around two conceptual stories, "Moon Saga"  (Moon, Crescent, Diabolos, Last Moon), which is a vampire story although by itself it is not, as the vampires were presented as a way of expressing a certain evil side and existence of humans, and "Requiem et Reminiscence" or short "ЯR" (Rebirth, Re:Born), which is set during the World War II. The themes of both concepts are based around the existential questions of humanity. They are symbolical and psychological stories about the repetition of human sins, war and the question of what is the ultimate meaning of human life. His process of writing songs and making concerts is by first writing the story, then writing and composing the songs based on it with a specific image in the live performance. It results in songs that are conceptually related, but still independent from each other. These conceptual kind of shows are different from typical live shows, and don't fit in the usual categories of a musical or a theatre play. Thus Gackt calls them "Visualive", because they are formed by a story, video images, music, theatre and musical elements, as well as live performance. The live form was originally created during the "Requiem et Reminiscence" tour in 2001, and according to Gackt, it took him almost ten years to arrive to a satisfying point of form during the "Requiem et Reminiscence II" tour in 2008-2009. However, he found such way of expression very exhausting and difficult, with a profitability that is not in accordance with the demands of entertainment industry.

Acting career

Gackt's introduction to filmmaking, in addition to music videos, came in 2001 and 2002 with two TV documentaries. First, he traveled to Madagascar for the TV show  then participated in the children's documentary, Hero's Hero, both aired on NHK. In 2003, he worked on the script and starred in his film, Moon Child. It was released on April 19 in Japan, and screened on May 13 at the Cannes Film Festival and on April 12, 2004, at Philadelphia Film Festival. He voiced Seiji in the original video animation, New Fist of the North Star, for which two of his older songs were used as themes and released as a single "Lu:na/Oasis". Gackt also assisted as a model and provided the voice and the motion capture for a main character in the video game Bujingai by Taito and Red Entertainment. His next involvement was in 2006, with the Final Fantasy franchise, for a video game Dirge of Cerberus, and again in 2007 for a video game Crisis Core, where the character Genesis Rhapsodos was modeled on, voiced and co-created by Gackt. Besides that, Gackt composed and performed two theme songs for the first game, which were released in the single "Redemption".

In 2007, Gackt played the Sengoku-period daimyō Uesugi Kenshin in the NHK Taiga drama, Fūrin Kazan, for which he was nominated for the TV Navi award as best-supporting actor in a drama category. His only chart-topping single, "Returner (Yami no Shūen)", was the theme for the TV series. Gackt recalls that Kenshin was always portrayed as a very tough man. Thus his vision, which presented him clean-shaven and with long hair, received harsh criticism, but Ken Ogata expressed his approval and supported Gackt's work in the drama. In the same year Gackt was a voice actor in the Japanese dub of the French animated-live action film, Arthur and the Minimoys. In 2008, Gackt was filming in Romania for his first international film debut, Bunraku, which was released in 2010. The next year he appeared as a prisoner on death row in the second episode of the TV series, Mr. Brain, and the film Kamen Rider Decade: All Riders vs. Dai-Shocker.

In 2010, he was a voice actor several times, first for the film Arthur and the Revenge of Maltazard, then the anime series Shiki, his first regular voice cast role; and Tono to Issho, where he provided the voice for the daimyo he previously played on television. He also voiced characters for two video games, Dragon Nest, for which he composed and performed the theme song, "Ever", and Mobile Suit Gundam: Extreme Vs.. In 2011, he was a voice actor for the sequel of the Tono to Issho anime series, Supernatural: The Animation (episode 21 first season), and Sket Dance for which he also performed its theme, "Graffiti", as well. He appeared in the TV drama,  in which he played Jotei Gai, a Chinese eunuch who tries to take over the Ryukyu Kingdom. He was also a voice actor and theme song performer for the animated film, Dragon Age: Dawn of the Seeker.

In 2012, Gackt appeared in the Sengoku Basara television drama, Sengoku Basara: Moonlight Party, as the games' depiction of warlord Oda Nobunaga. He also performed the series' theme song "Hakuro" (his 42nd single). He was also seen in a dual role as a Professor of Neurology Shiki Takashi and Yumeoji (literally translated "Dream Prince") in the drama Akumu-chan, which is based on the novel  by Riku Onda. In November 2013, Gackt appeared as a guest-star in two episodes (21 & 22) of the Indonesian Tokusatsu series, Bima Satria Garuda, as "Noir", the mysterious "Bima Legend" Knight from Parallel World. Gackt collaborated with Square Enix on the role-playing game 3594e for iOS, based on the story of Romance of the Three Kingdoms, a Chinese historical novel. The in-game playable character, military general Lü Bu, was voiced by him and he also provided a theme song.

In 2015, Gackt made a cameo appearance in Origami, a short film by director Cato Ochi. It premiered at the Cannes Film Festival. In the same year he voiced the characters Uesugi Kenshin and Sengoku Gackt, as well as provided the opening theme song of the mobile game Sengoku Shura Soul. The movie is set at the Yaeyama Islands of Okinawa, and Gackt portrays photographer Hikaru Ooyama who falls in love with a girl, Mami who mysteriously disappears. In the same year he voiced Maten Ruedo in the mobile game Othellonia, was a voice actor for and provided opening and ending theme songs for the anime Trickster, and also dubbed the main role played by Tom Hiddleston in the Japanese dub of Kong: Skull Island. The film was released in early 2019 to critical acclaim, and Gackt was nominated at the 43rd Japan Academy Film Prize for Outstanding Performance by an Actor in a Leading Role. On 1 October 2022 was confirmed to have started working on Tonde Saitama sequel which will be released in 2023.

Theatre
In May 2010, a play named Nemuri Kyoshiro Buraihikae was staged at Nissay Theatre in Tokyo, in which Gackt starred as the main protagonist. The show ran for 120 performances in seven cities until February 27, 2011, with an estimated 150,000 spectators. In 2012, Gackt announced a plan to continue the concept of "Moon Saga" with a stage theatre play written, composed and directed by him, 'Moon Saga - Mysteries of Yoshitsune, in which he starred as Minamoto no Yoshitsune, starting from July 15 at Akasaka ACT Theatre in Tokyo. The final two of 60 shows were held on September 26 and October 2, in Tokyo. The estimated audience was about 50,000 spectators. At several plays, with the help of the Ashinaga Organization, orphans from the 2011 Tōhoku earthquake were invited and also received a monetary donation for scholarship. The second "Moon" stage theatre adaptation ran from August until October 2014, with 40 performances in seven cities, and in the same time period the play's original soundtrack was released.

Business ventures
In 2016, Gackt co-founded a real estate company with Satoshi Ikeda, named Gackt & Ikeda Asia Bridge Partnerz, in Kuala Lumpur, Malaysia. In 2017, he got involved as a core member and strategic advisor for Asia of a virtual currency project, Spindle.

In the media
Gackt's sex appeal has been noted by national polls, such as by Oricon, similar to those done by People. He is often ranked as the most or one of the most beautiful Japanese celebrities. In 2009, he was also ranked fifth among rock music personalities in Japanese history. Gackt is considered a fashion icon, J-pop and national idol, and due to his involvement with the visual kei movement, which emphasizes androgynous and changing appearance, he is referred to as a "living manifestation of readers' fantasy men" found in bishōnen manga. He has been compared to fictional characters like Griffith from Berserk, and Cloud Strife from Final Fantasy VII, as well as having been an inspiration for manga characters. Gackt appeared in many television commercials, including for Fujifilm, Shiseido, Daihatsu, Niconico, Tsutaya, Square Enix, and Konami, among others. Over the years, Gackt appeared as a performer, guest and regular member on several television variety shows, including Hey! Hey! Hey! Music Champ, and since 2009, TV Asahi's New Year's special Geinoujin-Kakuzuke-Check(Celebrity Rating Check), where he holds the record of 71 individual winning streaks.

Personal life
When he was 20 years old, Gackt was briefly married to a Korean woman. Gackt has lived for most of his life in Tokyo, Japan. In 2012 he moved to the Philippines and Hong Kong, with his primary residence located in Malaysia, where he has a house of 1,700 square meters situated in a residential area on the outskirts of Kuala Lumpur.

He is fluent in Mandarin, Korean, English, and speaks some French. He has a second-degree black belt rank in ITF taekwondo, as well experience in other martial arts like karate, boxing, jiu-jitsu among others. In the past years he enjoys playing poker and since 2017 plays competitively on live tournaments, with largest cash of $75,600 from fourth-place finish in Aria High Roller, Las Vegas.

He stated that his philosophical way of life is similar to Japanese Bushido. His personal religious belief is close to a nature god. His family believed that their deceased members became gods and they should venerate them, hence exist two conceptions of Ryukyuan religion in Okinawa whether to venerate the ancestors or nature. It does not have a well-defined theorization and rituals, but the practice is an acknowledgment of everything that surrounds people, "a love of nature".

Discography

Solo

 Mizérable (extended-play) (1999)
 Mars (2000)
 Rebirth (2001)
 Moon (2002)
 Crescent (2003)
 Love Letter (2005)
 Diabolos (2005)
 Re:Born (2009)
 Last Moon (2016)

Malice Mizer

 Voyage Sans Retour (1996)
 Merveilles (1998)

Filmography 
 Movies
 Moon Child (2003), Shō
 Kamen Rider Decade: All Riders vs. Dai-Shocker (2009), Joji Yuki
 Bunraku (2010), Yoshi
 The Tempest 3D (2012) 
 Akumu-chan (2014), Takashi Shiki/Yume Ōji
 Origami (2015, short film)
 Karanukan (2018), Hikaru Ooyama
 Fly Me to the Saitama (2019), Rei Asami
 The Confidence Man JP: Episode of the Princess (2020), Mysterious man
 Fly Me to the Saitama II (2023), Rei Asami

 Voice acting
 New Fist of the North Star (2003, OVA), Seiji
 Bujingai (2003, video game), Lau Wong
 Dirge of Cerberus: Final Fantasy VII (2006, video game), Genesis Rhapsodos
 Crisis Core: Final Fantasy VII (2007, video game), Genesis Rhapsodos
 Arthur and the Minimoys (2007, animated film, Japanese dubbed version), Maltazard
 Arthur and the Revenge of Maltazard (2010, animated film, Japanese dubbed version), Maltazard
 Shiki (2010, anime), Seishiro Kirishiki
 Tono to Issho (2010, anime), Kenshin Uesugi
 Dragon Nest (2010, video game)
 Mobile Suit Gundam: Extreme Vs. (2010, video game)
 Supernatural: The Animation (2011, anime), Andy
 Sket Dance (2011, anime), Kiyoshi "Dante" Date
 Dragon Age: Dawn of the Seeker (2012, animated film), Knight Commander
 3594e (2014, mobile game)
 Sengoku Shura Soul (2015, mobile game)
 Othellonia (2016, mobile game)
 Trickster (2016, anime), Fiend With Twenty Faces
 Kong: Skull Island (2017, feature film, Japanese dubbed version), James Conrad
 Crisis Core: Final Fantasy VII Reunion (2022, video game), Genesis Rhapsodos

Television series and documentaries
  (2001)
 Hero's Hero (2002)
 Fūrin Kazan (2007), Uesugi Kenshin
 Mr. Brain (2009), Takegami Teijiro (Ep. 2)
 The Tempest (2011), Jyoteigai
 Akumu-chan (2012), Takashi Shiki/Yumeoji
 Sengoku Basara: Moonlight Party (2012), Oda Nobunaga
 Bima Satria Garuda (2013), Noir
 Time Spiral (2014), Shuya Tatsumi

Tours
Arena tours:
2000: Mars Sora Kara no Homonsha
2001: Requiem et Reminiscence
2002: Kagen no Tsuki
2003: Jogen no Tsuki
2004: The Sixth Day & Seventh Night
2005-06: Diabolos ~Aien no Shi~
2008-09: Requiem et Reminiscence II ~Saisei to Kaikou~
2013: Best of the Best Vol. I
2016: Last Visualive Saigo no Tsuki –Last Moon–
2020: Khaos

Club tours:
1999: 99 Gackt Resurrection & Easter Live
2006-07: Training Days D.r.u.g. Party

Theater, Hall tours:
2021: Last Songs 2021 feat. K
2023: Last Songs 2023 feat. K

Notes

References

Further reading
  (autobiography)
  (novel)
  (quotes collection)
  (novel)
  (quotes collection)
  (blog post collection)
  (business book)

External links

 Official website (Japanese, Chinese, English)
 Official community site (Japanese)
 

Malice Mizer members
Avex Trax artists
Gan-Shin artists
Japanese expatriates in Malaysia
Japanese male singer-songwriters
Japanese male rock singers
Japanese male pop singers
Japanese rock pianists
Visual kei musicians
Japanese male film actors
Japanese male television actors
Japanese male video game actors
Japanese male voice actors
21st-century Japanese male actors
Japanese poker players
Musicians from Okinawa Prefecture
Male voice actors from Okinawa Prefecture
Ryukyuan people
1973 births
Living people
Male pianists
Japanese baritones
Japanese YouTubers
20th-century Japanese male singers
20th-century Japanese pianists
21st-century Japanese male singers
21st-century Japanese pianists